Borja Galán González (born 26 April 1993) is a Spanish footballer who plays for Polish club Odra Opole as a winger.

Football career
Born in Madrid, Galán joined Atlético Madrid's youth setup in 2002, aged nine. He made his senior debut with the C-team during the 2010–11 season in Tercera División, while still a youth.

Galán was promoted to the reserves ahead of the 2012–13 campaign, appearing regularly. In 2013, he suffered a severe knee injury which kept him sidelined for 15 months.

On 29 July 2015, after suffering relegation, Galán joined Getafe CF and was assigned to the B-side in the third division. On 14 July 2016 he moved to another reserve team, Deportivo de La Coruña B in the fourth tier.

On 5 July 2018, Galán signed a two-year deal with Segunda División side AD Alcorcón, with Dépor holding a buy-back clause. He made his professional debut on 18 August, coming on as a second-half substitute for Nono in a 1–1 home draw against Sporting de Gijón.

On 8 July 2019, Galán returned to Dépor after the club exercised the buy-back clause on his contract. The following 31 January, however, he moved to fellow second division side Racing de Santander on loan until June.

References

External links

1993 births
Living people
Footballers from Madrid
Spanish footballers
Spain youth international footballers
Association football wingers
Segunda División players
Segunda División B players
Tercera División players
Atlético Madrid C players
Atlético Madrid B players
Getafe CF B players
Deportivo Fabril players
AD Alcorcón footballers
Deportivo de La Coruña players
Racing de Santander players
UD Logroñés players
Hércules CF players
Odra Opole players
Spanish expatriate footballers
Expatriate footballers in Poland
Spanish expatriate sportspeople in Poland